Destination... Christmas! is the first full-length studio album by comedy synthpop band The Superions, a side project of Fred Schneider of The B-52s. The album was released October 25, 2010 on New York-based record label Fanatic Records distributed by EMI/Caroline Distribution on CD, LP and as a digital download. The single "Fruitcake" was released on iTunes ahead of the album on September 21, 2010.

Fred Schneider said about the album that the 11 original tracks "cover all the Christmas themes: yetis, avalanches, fruitcake. It's not traditional."

Track listing
 "Santa's Disco" 3:54
 "Fruitcake" 3:36
 "Chillin' at Christmas" 4:18
 "Teddy And Betty Yeti" 4:29
 "Christmas Conga (Jungle Bells)" 3:48
 "Jingle Those Bells" 2:48
 "Under the Tree" 3:42
 "Crummy Christmas Tree" 2:33
 "Laughter at Christmas" 2:19
 "Christmas Tears" 4:15
 "Santa Je T'aime" 4:21

Formats
 CD - Digipak containing the 11-track album, features an 8-page booklet with lyrics.
 LP - containing the 11-track album, features an inner sleeve with lyrics and a download card good for a digital copy of the album.
 Digital version - containing the 11-track album, features a 14-page digital booklet with exclusive artwork by Brian Fraley.
 Digital "Deluxe Version" - containing the 11-track album, includes the music videos "Fruitcake" and "Santa's Disco" and 14-page digital booklet.

Personnel
Band
 Fred Schneider - lyrics, vocals, sleigh bells and drum sticks
 Noah Brodie - keyboards, electronic drums, vocals, backing vocals, sleigh bells and drum sticks
 Dan Marshall - programming, vocals and backing vocals

Additional musicians
 Backing vocals on "Santa's Disco": Amy Luther and Rachel McCabe
 The Crummy Christmas Carolers: Lashunda Flowers, Tedra Hawthorne, Bill Ludicke, Amy Luther, Rachel McCabe, Deb Ofsowitz, Kimber Parrish, Chris Shelton, Karyn Shelton

Production
 All songs written and arranged by The Superions
 Lyrics by Fred Schneider
 Music by Noah Brodie and Dan Marshall
 Produced by The Superions
 Recorded and Mixed by The Superions in Winter Park, FL January–July 2010
 Mastered by Bob Katz at Digital Domain, Longwood, FL
 Additional Mix by Jarrett Pritchard
 Business and Legal Consultant: Dave Brodie
 Illustrations: Brian Fraley
 Photography: Caitlin Sullivan
 Special Thanks: Josh Bloom & Sean Boyd

Charts
Destination... Christmas! debuted at #13 on the Billboard Comedy Albums Chart on December 18, 2010.

References

External links
 http://thesuperions.com
 http://fanaticrecords.com

2010 Christmas albums
Christmas albums by American artists
Pop Christmas albums